LHHS may refer to any of the following high schools:

 Lyman Hall High School, located in Wallingford, Connecticut
 Laguna Hills High School, located in Laguna Hills, California
 La Habra High School, located in La Habra, California
 Lake Highlands High School, located in Dallas, Texas
 Lake Howell High School, located in Winter Park, Florida
 Leo Hayes High School, located in Fredericton, New Brunswick
 Lake Havasu High School, located in Lake Havasu, Arizona
 Licking Heights High School, located in Pataskala, Ohio
Liberty Hill High School, located in Liberty Hill, Texas
 Lake Hamilton High School, located in Pearcy, Arkansas